The first season of Jem aired between October 6, 1985, and March 15, 1987, as a first-run syndication in the United States. The season has a total of 26 episodes each with a running time of approximately 22 minutes. The first 5 episodes initially aired as 15 7-minute segments with each episode broken into 3 parts. There was a later version of the first 5 episodes which came out in 1986 when the show first came into syndication where some scenes from the original 7 minute segments were either altered, extended (like a lot of the music videos sequences) or removed entirely.

Episodes

References

External links
 

1985 American television seasons
1986 American television seasons
1987 American television seasons